Frank Wilson Hulse, III (1913 – 1992), founder and former chairman of Southern Airways. He is a member of the Georgia Aviation Hall of Fame.

References

External links 
Southern Airways employees website

1913 births
1992 deaths
20th-century American businesspeople
Southern Airways